Lesley Allardice (born 8 July 1957) is a retired British international swimmer.

Swimming career
She competed in four events at the 1972 Summer Olympics.

Although Scottish born she represented England and won a bronze medal in the 4 x 100 metres freestyle relay, at the 1970 British Commonwealth Games in Edinburgh, Scotland.

Four years later she repeated the success by winning another bronze medal in the 4 x 100 metres freestyle relay, at the 1974 British Commonwealth Games in Christchurch, New Zealand.

She is a two times winner of the British Championship in 100 metres freestyle (1972-1973), four times winner of the 200 metres freestyle (1970-1973) and was the 400 metres freestyle champion in 1971.

References

External links
 

1957 births
Living people
British female swimmers
Olympic swimmers of Great Britain
Swimmers at the 1972 Summer Olympics
Sportspeople from Kirkcaldy
Swimmers at the 1970 British Commonwealth Games
Swimmers at the 1974 British Commonwealth Games
Commonwealth Games medallists in swimming
Commonwealth Games bronze medallists for England
20th-century British women
Medallists at the 1970 British Commonwealth Games
Medallists at the 1974 British Commonwealth Games